Girouard Lake is a freshwater body of water crossed by the Mégiscane River, in the north-eastern part of Senneterre, in La Vallée-de-l'Or Regional County Municipality (RCM), in the administrative region of Abitibi-Témiscamingue, in the province of Quebec, in Canada.

Girouard Lake is located entirely in the township of Girouard. Forestry is the main economic activity of the sector. Recreational tourism activities come second.

The hydrographic slope of Lake Girouard is accessible via the Faillon Lake Road (East-West direction) that passes on the south side of Lake Girouard; in addition, another forest road (East-West direction) serves an area northwest of the Mégiscane River which includes the southern part of the Lake Wetetnagami Biodiversity Reserve.

The surface of Girouard Lake is usually frozen from early November to mid-May, however safe ice circulation is generally from mid-November to mid-April.

Geography

Toponymy
The hydronym "Lac Girouard" is linked to that of the township of Girouard. The term "Girouard" is a family name of French origin.

The toponym "lac Girouard" was formalized on December 5, 1968, by the Commission de toponymie du Québec, when it was created.

Notes and references

See also 

Lakes of Abitibi-Témiscamingue
Nottaway River drainage basin